Makhtar Gueye (born 7 January 1997) is a Senegalese basketball player for Clube Ferroviário da Beira. He also plays for the Senegal national basketball team. Gueye played college basketball for the UAB Blazers for three years.

College career
Gueye joined UAB Blazers in 2017 from Aspire academy, in his freshman season he played 32 games averaged 2.2 ponts, 1.59 rebounds and 0.22 assists. He scored eight points in his UAB debut against Jacksonville, and his high score for the season was 9 points in a win over Alabama A&M

In his sophomore year, he played in all 35 games and made 28 starts. He averaged 8.26 ponts, 6.69 rebounds and 0.80 assists.

In his Junior year he played 32 games and made 28 starts, averaging 6.81 ponts, 5.09 rebounds and 0.75 assists.

Professional career 
On August 6, 2021, Gueye signed with CB Menorca of the LEB Plata.

Gueye signed his second professional contract with Clube Ferroviário da Beira in February 2023, after participating in the 2023 BAL Combine in Paris in January.

National team career
Makhtar Gueye represented the Senegal national basketball team at the 2019 FIBA Basketball World Cup in China, where he averaged 4.7 points and 0.7 rebounds per game.

References

External links
 usbasket.com profile

1997 births
Living people
Forwards (basketball)
People from Rufisque
Senegalese expatriate basketball people in the United States
Senegalese men's basketball players
UAB Blazers men's basketball players
2019 FIBA Basketball World Cup players